In physical anthropology, protoculture is the passing of behaviours from one generation to another among non-human primates. These cultures are very rudimentary, and do not exhibit complex cultural technology.  

For example, tool usage is learned between generations within chimpanzee troupes.  One troupe of chimpanzees may exhibit a learned behavior unique from another troupe of chimpanzees, such as various tool usage.  Some chimpanzee troupes have been observed consuming aspilia, possibly for medicinal purposes, because it has been seen to remove intestinal parasites, and is otherwise unpalatable.

References

Anthropology